Pickering GO Station is a train and bus station in the GO Transit network located in Pickering, Ontario, Canada. It is a stop on the Lakeshore East line and was the eastern terminus from 1967 until 1990, when service was extended to Whitby and subsequently to Oshawa.

History

The previous Pickering station, which had been constructed by Grand Trunk Railway in the early 1900s, had been about 2 kilometres east of the current location at Liverpool Road. Plans for the original GO Transit Lakeshore line called for commuter train service not to go beyond Liverpool Road where the CN York Subdivision tracks joined the CN Kingston Subdivision, because this would interfere with freight trains. No practical site could be found, but there was a large field south of the tracks on the east side of Liverpool Road with more than enough space to accommodate a station building, bus terminal and car parking, with convenient access from Bayly Street. Installation of a new crossover before the overpass at Liverpool Road was required to get to an existing industrial track, so that GO Trains standing at the station platform would be off the main line.

When the station opened in 1967 it was a key transfer point between train and bus services.

In 1990 the single platform was supplement by two more platforms and tracks when GO Transit built a dedicated right-of-way on the north side of the Canadian National tracks. This was part of the project to expand Lakeshore East train service to Ajax and Whitby, and finally to a new terminus at the Oshawa Via Rail station in 1995.

Station layout

Platforms

Pickering has three platforms for trains, 1 and 2 which serve trains to Union and trains to Oshawa. Track 3, separated from the other tracks, is closest to the bus bays and station. Track 3 is the original track before the extension to Oshawa, which serves Express and Local trains to and from Union which terminate in Pickering.

Pedestrian bridge
The Pickering Pedestrian Bridge was opened in 2012 between the GO station on its south side of the tracks and Pickering Town Centre, a shopping centre with access to regional bus service on the bridge's north side. The  enclosed bridge spans 6 railway tracks, the 14 lanes of Highway 401 and the two-lane Pickering Parkway, a municipal road. At night, the bridge is illuminated by 300 LED lights in rotating shades of lilac, purple, blue and teal making the bridge visible from overflying airplanes. The bridge has received the City of Pickering’s 2019 Urban Design Award and the 2019 Engineering News Record Global Best Projects Award. In 2021, the bridge became a Guinness World Record holder for the longest enclosed pedestrian bridge in the world. Exterior cladding of the bridge in a metallic mesh proved to be problematic during construction and, along with severe weather, delayed its completion.

Parking
, the station has three parking lots with respectively 585, 780 and 500 spaces plus a multi-level parking garage finished in 2013 or 2014 with 1673 spaces.

Connecting bus routes

The station is the Pickering hub for Durham Region Transit local bus services, which evolved from the Bay Ridges Dial-a-Bus in 1970.
Durham Region Transit 
 101 Bay Ridges
 103 Glenanna (Pickering Parkway Terminal)
 110 Finch 
 112 Valley Farm
 120 Whites
 291 Harwood/Kingston
 900 PULSE Highway 2 (Pickering Parkway Terminal)
 916 PULSE Rossland (Pickering Parkway Terminal)
 917 Bayly-Consumers (Pickering Parkway Terminal)

GO Transit
 41 - Hamilton/Pickering
 90B/C - Lakeshore East Early Morning Bus
 94 - Pickering/Square One

References

External links

Pickering GO Station construction at GO Transit
, published by CityNews on September 23, 2021

GO Transit railway stations
Railway stations in the Regional Municipality of Durham
Rail transport in Pickering, Ontario
Railway stations in Canada opened in 1967
1967 establishments in Ontario